Fred W. Halstead (April 21, 1927 – June 2, 1988) was the Socialist Workers Party's candidate for President of the United States in 1968.  His running mate was Paul Boutelle.

Halstead played a significant role in the movement against the Vietnam War, outlined in his book Out Now! He also was a staff writer on The Militant, the publication of the Socialist Workers Party.

Halstead was a 6′6″, 350-pound ex–garment cutter who worked briefly as a bouncer in a country-and-western saloon in the 1950s, when he was on the blacklist.

Bibliography
 GIs Speak Out Against the War: The Case of the Ft. Jackson 8 (1970)
 Out Now!: A Participant's Account of the American Movement against the Vietnam War (1978) 
 What Working People Should Know About the Dangers of Nuclear Power (1979) 
 The 1985-86 Hormel Meat-Packers Strike in Austin, Minnesota (1987)

References

1927 births
1988 deaths
Candidates in the 1968 United States presidential election
20th-century American politicians
Socialist Workers Party (United States) presidential nominees
American anti–Vietnam War activists
Socialist Workers Party (United States) politicians from California
Activists from California